Toskatok (also Romanized as Toskātok; also known as Tūskātok) is a village in Baladeh Kojur Rural District, in the Central District of Nowshahr County, Mazandaran Province, Iran. At the 2006 census, its population was 1,423, in 376 families.

References 

Populated places in Nowshahr County